Daviesia pachyphylla, commonly known as ouch bush, is a species of flowering plant in the family Fabaceae and is endemic to the south of Western Australia. It is usually a slender shrub with often arching branchlets, crowded, sharply-pointed, narrowly conical phyllodes, and yellow to orange and dark reddish-brown flowers.

Description

Taxonomy and naming
Daviesia pachyphylla was first formally described in 1863 by Ferdinand von Mueller in Fragmenta Phytographiae Australiae from specimens collected by George Maxwell. The specific epithet (pachyphylla) means "thick-leaved".

Distribution and habitat
Ouch bush grows in heath on laterite between the Fitzgerald River National Park, Ongerup,  Ravensthorpe and Munglinup in the Esperance Plains and Mallee biogeographic regions of Southwestern Australia.

Conservation status
Daviesia pachyphylla is listed as "not threatened" by the Government of Western Australia Department of Biodiversity, Conservation and Attractions.

References

pachyphylla
Eudicots of Western Australia
Plants described in 1863
Taxa named by Ferdinand von Mueller